In addition to the normal karyotype, wild populations of many animal, plant, and fungi species contain B chromosomes (also known as supernumerary, accessory, (conditionally-)dispensable, or lineage-specific chromosomes). By definition, these chromosomes are not essential for the life of a species, and are lacking in some (usually most) of the individuals. Thus a population would consist of individuals with 0, 1, 2, 3 (etc.) B chromosomes. B chromosomes are distinct from marker chromosomes or additional copies of normal chromosomes as they occur in trisomies.

Origin

The evolutionary origin of supernumerary chromosomes is obscure, but presumably, they must have been derived from heterochromatic segments of normal chromosomes in the remote past. In general "we may regard supernumeraries as a very special category of genetic polymorphism which, because of manifold types of accumulation mechanisms, does not obey the ordinary Mendelian laws of inheritance." (White 1973 p173)

Next generation sequencing has shown that the B chromosomes from rye are amalgamations of the rye A chromosomes. Similarly, B chromosomes of the cichlid fish Haplochromis latifasciatus also have been shown to arise from rearrangements of normal A chromosomes.

Function

Most B chromosomes are mainly or entirely heterochromatic (i.e. largely non-coding), but some contain sizeable euchromatic segments (e.g. such as the B chromosomes of maize). In some cases, B chromosomes act as selfish genetic elements. In other cases, B chromosomes provide some positive adaptive advantage. For instance, the British grasshopper Myrmeleotettix maculatus has two structural types of B chromosomes: metacentrics and submetacentric. The supernumeraries, which have a satellite DNA, occur in warm, dry environments, and are scarce or absent in humid, cooler localities.

There is evidence of deleterious effects of supernumeraries on pollen fertility, and favourable effects or associations with particular habitats are also known in a number of species.

B chromosomes have a tendency to accumulate in meiotic cell products resulting in an increase of B number over generations, thereby acting as selfish genetic elements. However, this effect is counterbalanced for selection against infertility.

In fungi

Chromosome polymorphisms are very common among fungi. Different isolates of the same species often have a different chromosome number, with some of these additional chromosomes being unnecessary for normal growth in culture. The extra chromosomes are known as conditionally dispensable, or supernumerary, because they are dispensable for certain situations, but may confer a selective advantage under different environments.

Supernumerary chromosomes do not carry genes that are necessary for basic fungal growth but may have some functional significance. For example, it has been discovered that the supernumerary chromosome of the pea pathogen Haematonectria haematococca carries genes that are important to the disease-causing capacity of the fungus. This supernumerary DNA was found to code for a group of enzymes that metabolize toxins, known as phytoalexins, that are secreted by the plant's immune system. It is possible that these supernumerary elements originated in horizontal gene transfer events because sequence analysis often indicates that they have a different evolutionary history from essential chromosomal DNA.

The wheat-infecting fungal pathogen Zymoseptoria tritici contains 8 dispensable B-chromosomes - the largest number of dispensable chromosomes observed in fungi.

References

Further reading

 (Special issue)

External links
 B Chromosomes
 B chromosomes in wood mice, genus Apodemus

Chromosomes